Orla Feeney is an Irish DJ, radio presenter and trance music producer. From Leixlip, County Kildare, she is signed to Vandit Records and currently presents shows on RTÉ Pulse and RTÉ 2FM.

She has formerly worked as a presenter or producer for i105-107FM, Kfm and Spin 1038. She was nominated for an Irish Dance Music Award in 2010 for Best New Artist and again in 2011 for Best Single.

Discography

EPs
 Comic Strip / Two Faced EP (2009)
 Lesson Learned / Random Madness EP (2010)
 Bittersweet / Pink Noise (2011)

Singles
 Orla Feeney - Comic Strip (2009)
 Orla Feeney - Two Faced (2009)
 Orla Feeney - Lesson Learned (2010)
 Orla Feeney - Random Madness (2010)
 Orla Feeney - Bittersweet (2011)
 Orla Feeney - Pink Noise (2011)
 Full Tilt & Orla Feeney - OTT (2011)
 Orla Feeney - Rollercoaster (2012)
 Tom Colontonio & Orla Feeney - New Born (2012)
 Orla Feeney & Lisa Lashes - Mind Control (2012)
 Orla Feeney & Deirdre Mc Laughlin - This Moment 
 Orla Feeney - Keltik Warrior
 Orla Feeney - Cosmology - Stripped Mix 
 Orla Feeney - Cosmology -  Original 
 Orla Feeney & Kristina Sky - Audacious (Melodic Mix)
 Orla Feeney & Kristina Sky - Audacious (Original Mix)
 Orla Feeney & Kristina Sky - Insubordinate 
 Orla Feeney - Time Out
 Orla Feeney & Kriess Guyte - Vortex 
 Orla Feeney & Kriess Guyte - Nebula
 Orla Feeney - Lilyhammer 
 Orla Feeney & Kristina Sky - Crestfallen
 Orla Feeney - Comic Stripped
 Orla Feeney - Lust (2018)
 Orla Feeney & Susan McDaid - Can't Give Up (2018)
 Orla Feeney - The Wrath (2018)
 Orla Feeney & Kriess Guyte ft Susan McDaid - U R All U Need 
 Orla Feeney - Phoenix

Remixes
 Giuseppe Ottaviani - Fallen (Orla Feeney remix) (2009)
 Sean Murphy - Open Eyes (Orla Feeney remix) (2009)
 Orla Feeney - Two Faced (O.M.F.G. remix)2009
 Indecent Noise - Cross The Line (Orla Feeney remix) (2009)
 Solid Sleep - Club Attack (Orla Feeney remix) (2010)
 HMC - When The Sun Comes Down (Orla Feeney remix) (2011)
 Nikolai - Ready to Flow (Orla Feeney rework)2011
 Marc Simz - Forbidden City (Orla Feeney remix)(2012)
 Full Tilt - Illuzionize  - Orla Feeney Remix
 Tom Colontonio feat Amber Noell - Wish You Were Here - Orla Feeney Remix
 HMC - Hannah & Miami Calling - When the Sun Comes Down - Orla Feeney Remix

References

Living people
Year of birth missing (living people)
Irish DJs
Irish radio producers
Irish record producers
Electronic dance music DJs
Women radio producers